
Gmina Ulhówek is a rural gmina (administrative district) in Tomaszów Lubelski County, Lublin Voivodeship, in eastern Poland, on the border with Ukraine.

Villages
Gmina Ulhówek contains the villages and settlements of Budynin, Dębina, Dyniska, Hubinek, Kolonia Hubinek, Kolonia Rzeplin, Kolonia Ulhówek, Korczmin, Korea, Krzewica, Machnówek, Magdalenka, Mogiła, Oserdów, Ostrów, Pod Brodem, Podlipy, Podlodów, Posadów, Przymiarki, Rechulówka, Rokitno, Rzeczyca, Rzeplin, Sidorówka, Szczepiatyn, Tarnoszyn, Turyna, Ulhówek, Wandzin, Wasylów, Wasylów Wielki and Żerniki.

Neighbouring gminas
Gmina Ulhówek is bordered by the gminas of Dołhobyczów, Jarczów, Łaszczów, Lubycza Królewska and Telatyn. It also borders Ukraine.

References

Polish official population figures 2006

Ulhowek
Tomaszów Lubelski County